The Phthiotis Football Clubs Association (Enossi Podosferikon Somation Phthiotidas) is a football (soccer) organization in Phthiotis that is part of the Greek Football Federation.  It was formed in 1951 as Phthiotis-Phocis Union (Ένωση Φθιωτιδοφωκίδας, Enossi Phthiotidophokidas) and included teams from Phthiotis and the neighbouring prefectures of Phocis and Evrytania. The Phocis FCA was formed in the 1985–86 season and later its organization in Evrytania was created in 1990. Its offices and headquarters is located at Othonos Street in the city of Lamia, in People's Square.  The association currently has three divisions: the A1 division which features 18 clubs, the Premier and the second division.  The winner of the A1 Division enters the national Fourth Division, teams finished 15th–18th relegates to the Premier division.

The early years
Football (soccer) in Phthiotis was first played in the mid-1920s.  From 1930 until 1940 Olympiacos Lamia won every title except for 1935 when Pallamiaki won the championship.  Postwar, between 1946 and the 1950–51 season, Olympiacos won six more titles, one of the most famous being in 1947 when Ethnikos Lamias won 5-0 against Pallamiakos on May 23 and won the local championships.

Titles

1929–30: Olympiacos Lamia
1930–31: Olympiacos Lamia
1931–32: Olympiacos Lamia
1932–33: Olympiacos Lamia
1933–34: Olympiacos Lamia
1934–35: Pallamiaki Lamia
1935–36: Olympiacos Lamia
1936–37: Olympiacos Lamia
1937–38: Olympiacos Lamia
1938–39: Olympiacos Lamia
1939–40: Olympiacos Lamia
1941–45: Cancelled due to WWII
1946–47: Ethnikos Lamia
1947–48: Olympiacos Lamia
1948–49: Olympiacos Lamia
1949–50: Fokikos
1950–51: Olympiacos Lamia

Titles (1952–85)

Fokikos was the first club to win two titles in 1972; Malessina was next in 1980.
The cup events was created in the 1972–73 season.  In later years, the best clubs took part in the preliminaries of the Greek Cup.

Titles (1986–present)

All clubs from the Evrytania prefecture split from Phthiotis and formed their own association.

There were teams that won two titles: Olympiacos from Anthyli in 1995 and Atromitos Sperchiada in 2009.

A1 Division (2011–12 season)
Achilleas Domokos (91 pts)
PAS Lamia 1964 (88 pts)
Stylida FC (75 pts)
Opountios Martinos (72 pts)
Enossi 2010 (66 pts)
Aris Agios Konstantinos (61 pts)
Malessina 2008 (49 pts)
Atalanti (40 pts)
Magnissiakos (47 pts)
Elatiakos (47 pts)
Proodeftiki Larymna (47 pts)
Olympiacos Lamia (46 pts)
Akadimia/Iraklis (45 pts)
Divri (39 pts)
Spercheiada 2005 (29 pts)
Tymfristos (13 pts)
Ekkara
Glyfa

2012 Cup
Cup winner in Fthiotida in 2012, was achieved by Aris Agios Konstantinos (for the first time in the association).

Sources
onsports.gr - Sports Homepage 
Athlitiki Icho, the sports newspaper's main webpage

References

Sport in Phthiotis
Sports organizations established in 1951
Association football governing bodies in Greece
1951 establishments in Greece